Houston Miller Scott (born February 9, 1962, Richmond, Virginia, United States) is an American harmonica player, singer and songwriter. He is also a professional investments counselor.

Scott started playing his harmonica in Clifton Forge, Virginia, in 1978, where he lived with his father from 1975 to 1980. Scott  has played with many acts, including the Huey Blue Review, The Lee Boys, Peter Tork, Dickey Betts, Marshall Tucker, Mark Vegas, Jerry Joseph, Micheal Franti and Spearhead, and The Blind Boys of Alabama. He has also sat in with Robert Randolph and the Family Band at The Lyric Theater in Blacksburg, Virginia. 
 
Scott recorded with Bill Leverty of the rock band, FireHouse, on his solo album, Deep South, where Scott played harmonica on track 10, "Man of Constant Sorrow".

References

1962 births
Living people
Musicians from Virginia
American blues harmonica players
People from Henrico County, Virginia
People from Clifton Forge, Virginia